Prepiella is a genus of moths in the subfamily Arctiinae. The genus was described by Schaus in 1899.

Species
 Prepiella aurea Butler, 1875
 Prepiella convergens Schaus, 1905
 Prepiella deicoluria Schaus, 1940
 Prepiella hippona Druce, 1885
 Prepiella miniola Hampson, 1900
 Prepiella pexicera Schaus, 1899
 Prepiella phoenicolopha Hampson, 1914
 Prepiella procridia Hampson, 1905
 Prepiella radicans Hampson, 1905
 Prepiella sesapina Butler, 1877
 Prepiella strigivenia Hampson, 1900

References

Lithosiini
Moth genera